David Chanoff is a noted author of non-fiction work. His work has typically involved collaborations with the principal protagonist of the work concerned. His collaborators have included; Augustus A. White, Joycelyn Elders, Đoàn Văn Toại, William J. Crowe, Ariel Sharon, Kenneth Good and Felix Zandman. He has also written about a wide range of subjects including literary history, education and foreign for The Washington Post, The New Republic and The New York Times Magazine. He has published more than twelve books.

Selected publications 
 David Chanoff and Doan Van Toai (1986) Vietnam: A Portrait of Its People at War, I.B. Tauris Publishers
 Sharon, Ariel and David Chanoff (1989) Warrior : the autobiography of Ariel Sharon; New York : Simon and Schuster
 Good, Kenneth and David Chanoff (1992) Into the heart : one man's pursuit of love and knowledge among the Yanomami, Ulverscroft
 Crowe, William J and David Chanoff (1993) The line of fire : from Washington to the Gulf, the politics and battles of the new military, Simon & Schuster
 Elders, M Joycelyn and David Chanoff (1996) Joycelyn Elders, M.D. : from sharecropper's daughter to surgeon general of the United States of America, Morrow
 White, Augustus A. and David Chanoff (2011) Seeing Patients: Unconscious Bias in Health Care, Harvard University Press
Zadman, Felix and David Chanoff (1995) Never the last journey: a Fortune 500 founder's life story from Holocaust survivor to victor on Wall Street, Shocken.

References 

Living people
American male writers
Year of birth missing (living people)